The Harmood-Banner Baronetcy, of Liverpool in the County of Lancaster, was a title in the Baronetage of the United Kingdom. It was created on 26 February 1924 for the accountant, steel maker and Conservative politician John Harmood-Banner. The title became extinct on the death of the third Baronet in 1990.

Harmood-Banner baronets, of Liverpool (1924)
Sir John Sutherland Harmood-Banner, 1st Baronet (1847–1927)
Sir Harmood Harmood-Banner, 2nd Baronet (1876–1950)
Sir George Knowles Harmood-Banner, 3rd Baronet (1918–1990)

References

Extinct baronetcies in the Baronetage of the United Kingdom